Static on the Airwaves is the tenth studio album by folk-punk rock band the Levellers.

The "iTunes Deluxe Edition" contains two bonus tracks and two videos.

Reception

Ian Abrahams of Record Collector said the topic of war gives the album a "clear sense of conscience and purpose". He thought it was an improvement on its predecessor: "what they've got here is a dynamic play-it-loud maelstrom of sawing fiddles and firebrand lyrics".

Track listing
 "Static on the Airwaves"
 "We Are All Gunmen"
 "Truth Is"
 "After the Hurricane"
 "Our Forgotten Towns"
 "No Barriers"
 "Alone in This Darkness"
 "Raft of the Medusa"
 "Mutiny"
 "Traveller"
 "Second Life"
 "The Recruiting Sergeant"

iTunes bonus tracks
"Going Places"
"Ways We Have Won"
Truth Is (Video)	
Jeremy Cunningham's Tales From The Turntable (Video)

Personnel

Musicians
 Mark Chadwick - guitars, vocals
 Charlie Heather - drums/percussion
 Jeremy Cunningham - bass guitar, artwork
 Simon Friend - guitars, vocals, mandolin
 Jonathan Sevink - fiddle
 Matt Savage - keyboard

References

External links 
 Official Audiosamples on SoundCloud

Levellers (band) albums
2012 albums